Charles Jeremy Nigel Townshend FBA (born 27 July 1945) is a British historian with particular expertise on the history of British rule in Ireland and Mandatory Palestine.

Career
He worked for most of his career at Keele University, from which he retired as Professor Emeritus of International History.

Awards and Distinctions
2008 – Fellow of the British Academy

Bibliography

Books

 (Second edition published in 2011.) 

 (Published in the United States in 2011 as Desert Hell: The British Invasion of Mesopotamia.)

Articles

References

1945 births
Academics of Keele University
Alumni of Oriel College, Oxford
British historians
Fellows of the British Academy
Living people